Empress Liu (personal name unknown) (died  326), formally Empress Xianlie (literally "the wise and achieving empress") was an empress of the Xiongnu-led Han Zhao dynasty of China. She was Liu Yao's second empress.

Very little is known about Empress Liu, who was created empress in 325. It was likely that she was ethnically Han, because if she were Xiongnu, Liu Yao would not likely have married her due to the prohibition against endogamy given that they had the same family name.  When Empress Liu neared her own death in 326, Liu Yao asked her what her last requests were.  She stated that she was raised by her uncle Liu Chang (劉昶) and wished that Liu Yao could grant him honors.  She also stated that Liu Fang, the daughter of her other uncle Liu Ai (劉皚), was beautiful and virtuous, and she hoped that Liu Yao would create her empress.  After her death, Liu Yao created Liu Chang a duke and married Liu Fang, creating her empress.

References 

326 deaths
Former Zhao empresses
4th-century Chinese women
4th-century Chinese people
Year of birth unknown